"The Man with the Child in His Eyes" is a song by Kate Bush. It is the fifth track on her debut album The Kick Inside and was released as her second single, on the EMI label, in 1978.

Overview
Bush wrote the song when she was 13 and recorded it at the age of 16. It was recorded at AIR Studios, London, in June 1975 under the guidance of David Gilmour. She has said that recording with a large orchestra at that age terrified her. The song was Bush's second chart single in the United Kingdom where it reached number six in the summer of 1978. In the United States, the single was released in December of the same year. It became her first single to reach the Billboard pop singles chart, peaking at number 85 early in 1979. Bush performed this song in her one appearance on Saturday Night Live, singing on a piano being played by Paul Shaffer.

The single version slightly differs from the album version. On the single, the song opens with the phrase "he’s here!" echoing, an effect added after the album was released.

According to the sheet music published in Musicnotes.com by EMI Music Publishing, the song is set in the time signature of common time, with a moderate tempo of 88 beats per minute. It is written in the key of E minor.

In 2010, former radio and television presenter Steve Blacknell, Bush's first boyfriend, offered the original hand-written lyrics for the song for sale through music memorabilia website 991.com. The lyrics were written "in hot pink felt tip, complete with Kate Bush's own little pink circles in place of dots over the "I"'s."

Bush herself has never stated who she wrote the song about, but Blacknell has stated that a person close to Bush had told him the song was written about him. It had long been assumed it was about Gilmour.

The song received the Ivor Novello Award for "Outstanding British Lyric" in 1979.

Track listing
7" single (EMI 2806) (UK)
 "The Man with the Child in His Eyes" – 2:42
 "Moving" – 3:06

Chart performance

References

1978 singles
Kate Bush songs
Songs written by Kate Bush
1978 songs
EMI Records singles
Song recordings produced by David Gilmour
Song recordings produced by Andrew Powell
Ivor Novello Award winners